Major Harinder Singh ( – 31 August 1972) was an Indian politician in Punjab who served as Leader of the Opposition in the Punjab Assembly from 1969 to 1971, and also as Minister of Revenue and Industry in Giani Gurmukh Singh Musafir's cabinet from 1966 to 1967. He also remained the member of Central Legislative Assembly by winning election in 1945. Singh died in Amritsar on 31 August 1972, at the age of 55.

References

1910s births
1972 deaths
Leaders of the Opposition in Punjab, India
Members of the Central Legislative Assembly of India
Indian National Congress politicians from Punjab, India